Viasat 3 is a Hungarian TV channel. It began broadcasting on October 23, 2000.

Viasat 3 aired Hungary's first reality show in 2001 called A Bár (The Bar).

In 2015, the Sony Pictures Television acquired the Hungarian Viasat channels from Modern Times Group (MTG).

Programming

Comedy
 30 Rock
 8 Simple Rules
 According to Jim
 Andy Richter Controls the Universe
 Animal Practice
 Betty White's Off Their Rockers
 Everybody Loves Raymond
 Friends
 Futurama
 Gary Unmarried
 Hot in Cleveland
 I Dream of Jeannie
 Joey
 The King of Queens
 Mike & Molly
 The Nanny
 The New Adventures of Old Christine
 The Office
 Romantically Challenged
 Royal Pains
 Rules of Engagement
 Samantha Who?
 Scare Tactics
 The Simpsons
 Suburgatory
 Trigger Happy TV
 Two Guys and a Girl
 Two and a Half Men
 Vruć Vetar
 Will & Grace

Drama
 666 Park Avenue
 Agatha Christie's Poirot
 Agents of S.H.I.E.L.D.
 Ally McBeal
 Almost Human
 Andromeda
 Angel
 Bates Motel
 Being Erica
 Beyond Belief: Fact or Fiction
 The Blacklist
 Bron/Broen
 Brooklyn Nine-Nine
 Brothers & Sisters
 Buffy the Vampire Slayer
 The Carrie Diaries
 Castle
 Columbo
 Commander in Chief
 Conan the Adventurer
 Covert Affairs
 CSI: Crime Scene Investigation
 CSI: Miami
 Cult
 Cupid
 Da Vinci's Inquest
 Dawson's Creek
 The Dead Zone
 Der letzte Bulle
 Dexter
 Diagnosis: Murder
 Dinotopia
 Dirt
 Dracula
 Eleventh Hour
 ER
 Fairly Legal
 Father Dowling Mysteries
 Firefly
 The Flash
 Footballers' Wives
 Gilmore Girls
 Golden Boy
 Greek
 GSG 9 – Ihr Einsatz ist ihr Leben
 The Guardian
 Hidden Palms
 The Hoop Life
 House
 Instant Star
 The Invisible Man
 Jake and the Fatman
 Kojak
 Lark Rise to Candleford
 Las Vegas
 Law & Order: Criminal Intent
 Law & Order: LA
 Law & Order: Special Victims Unit
 Leverage
 Love Bites
 Medium
 Men in Trees
 Miami Medical
 Mission: Impossible
 Moonlight
 Motive
 Murder, She Wrote
 NCIS
 NCIS: Los Angeles
 NCIS: New Orleans
 Nikita
 Nip/Tuck
 Northern Exposure
 Numbers
 Nurse Jackie
 The O.C.
 Pacific Blue
 Person of Interest
 Petrocelli
 Philly
 Prime Suspect
 Pushing Daisies
 Ravenswood
 The Returned
 Rizzoli & Isles
 Russian Dolls: Sex Trade
 Shameless
 The Shannara Chronicles
 Shark
 Six Degrees
 Smallville
 SOKO Donau
 Southland
 Spartacus
 Special Unit 2
 St. Elsewhere
 The Streets of San Francisco
 Summerland
 Supernatural
 Total Recall 2070
 Trust Me
 Twin Peaks
 Ugly Betty
 Ultimate Force
 Vermist
 Veronica Mars
 Vikings
 Wanted
 Without a Trace
 The X-Files
 Zone Stad

Logos

References

External links
 

Television networks in Hungary
Viasat 3 Hungary
Sony Pictures Television
Television channels and stations established in 2000
2000 establishments in Hungary